IFPI Danmark is the Danish branch of the International Federation of the Phonographic Industry (IFPI) and is the official charts provider and recording sales certification body for Denmark.

Certification
Gold and platinum awards were first awarded in Denmark in the early 1990s. The sales requirements are the same for domestic and international repertoire. Note that Danish certification system for music products are awarded based on shipments.

Albums

 Sales can include digital downloads and also streams at a ratio of 1:1000

Singles

 Sales can include digital downloads and also streams at a ratio of 1:100

Streaming only

DVDs
Video-single DVDs

Full-length DVDs

Singles chart
See: Hitlisten

References

External links
Official website

Music organizations based in Denmark